Titus Munteanu (Titus-Adrian Muntean, 3 October 1941 − 18 December 2013) was a Romanian director, filmmaker and producer.

Munteanu began his television career in 1966 and was best known for his work with the broadcaster TVR 1.

In 2004, Munteanu received the Excellence Award from National Audiovisual Council (CNA).

Titus Munteanu died of respiratory disease on 18 December 2013, aged 72, in Bucharest, Romania.

References

External links

Titus Munteanu at CineMagia

1941 births
2013 deaths
Romanian film directors
Romanian television producers
20th-century Romanian male writers
Respiratory disease deaths in Romania